"Mosh" is a protest song by Eminem, released on October 26, 2004 as a digital single and the second single from his fifth studio album, Encore (2004). It was released just prior to the 2004 presidential election.

The video for the song is available for free on the Internet and encouraged voters to vote George W. Bush out of office. The song was excerpted from Eminem's album, Encore, not yet released at the time the video was made available to the public. G-Unit rapper Lloyd Banks also appears in the video.

This song is ranked 58th on About.com’s “100 Greatest Rap Songs".

Music video
The music video, released on the eve of the 2004 presidential election, is mostly animated. The video open with a scene of a school appears and the sound of children reciting the Pledge of Allegiance. There's a Iraq where a large crowd is gathered. Baghdad's Victory Arch is visible behind Eminem; the shot pans to the American flag as Eminem sings "we stronger now more than ever". An army private who returns home to his family, only to find he is being re-deployed to Iraq, and a mother served an eviction notice join a growing army of protesters, led by Eminem. By the end of the video, Eminem and the protesters are shown confronting armored police as Eminem continues to rap:
No more blood for oil, we got our own battles to fight on our soil
No more psychological warfare to trick us to think that we ain't loyal
The original version of this music video was released on November 1, 2004.

Ending
The original video has been called a "call to arms", both versions of the video end with an invitation to have analyzed this video in its post-9/11 context have suggested that breakdown of political dialogue comes from the protocols associated with the medium of speech. The scholars conclude as a technocracy that uses charm and subtleties to achieve conformity rather than force or violence.

Critical reception

Stephen Thomas Erlewine of AllMusic highlighted the song. Entertainment Weekly wrote a mixed description, saying the song "was nothing less than the sound of America's favorite Caucasian rapper at his most intense and focused. Protest songs made a comeback this year, but none captured doom and apocalypse the way 'Mosh' so brilliantly did. Eminem is still a narcissist, of course — he wants us to follow him to liberation, or at least to the voting booth — but the power of 'Mosh' made you forgive his never-ending self-absorption" and called the song itself an anomaly. DX magazine wrote that "he (Eminem) turns political and blatantly lashes out at Bush on 'Mosh' (sure to cause some repercussions from politicians considering his visibility)." Pitchfork Media wrote a mixed review: "'Mosh'—sadly, not yet completely past its sell-by date—seems more like a plodding dirge here among the spry string of tracks that surround it." NME magazine wrote a favorable review: "And then there's 'Mosh'. Oh boy, there's 'Mosh'. --- Should 'Encore' prove to be a swansong, then 'Mosh' is its blaze of glory, a scalding assault on the Bush regime that hits all the harder for its arriving days too late. The rapper sounds absolutely livid as he mounts a stealthy assault on the Prez that swells with density and rage over its five minutes until fire and brimstone is raining down on the shitwit Texan's perpetually befuddled head. Although you might argue that everything Eminem says is inherently political through the sheer numbers that he reaches and the sheer anti-social nature of most of what he espouses, this is a different kettle of politicised fish entirely. "If it rains, let it rain/Yeah, the wetter the better/They ain't gonna stop us, they can't/We're stronger now more than ever", he rages with a demented fervour that makes Rage Against the Machine sound like Belle & Sebastian. And if that non-specific rabble-rousery is a little on the vague side, the likes of "Stomp, push, shove, mush/Fuck Bush until they bring our troops home" should make it crystal clear. On a more base level, it's fucking fantastic to jump up and down and bang your head to, which is the level where politics and pop most effectively connect."  Steve Jones of USA Today said that the song "[lambastes] President Bush and his war policies."

The A.V. Club wrote of the song: "[Eminem] stops attacking scapegoats and straw men and finally goes after the people who actually wield power. Over Dr. Dre's apocalyptic production—all rain-clouds and thunderclaps—Eminem launches into a searing, overtly emotional attack on President Bush and his administration's bloodlust and misplaced priorities. Eminem has always been angry, but his anger has never before been this righteous, focused, or plugged in to what matters in American life." Los Angeles Times was somewhat positive too: he stated that Eminem "catches us off-guard with eloquent political reflections in 'Mosh,' his equivalent of Bob Dylan's "The Times They Are A-Changin'." While Eminem's rap doesn't have the timelessness or literary aspirations of the Dylan song, it hits with the visceral charge and topical urgency of the best rap. Lashing out at various social injustices, he leads a legion of young followers toward what appears to be the kind of violent rebellion one might expect in hard-core rock and rap. Instead, as the video for 'Mosh' shows, their charge is to the voting booth." The Austin Chronicle called the song a "potent anti-Bush rant".  SPIN was a bit positive: "The seething anti-Bush single 'Mosh' may not have brought droves of Eminem acolytes to the polls last November, but it suggests that Em—like fellow potty-mouth-turned activist Howard Stern—realizes that his gifts have uses beyond FCC-baiting and fart jokes."

RapReviews was also unimpressed: "'Mosh' suffers from a similar stigma: a disconcerted, ADD Eminem who can't seem to lock down his lyrics." Robert Christgau of Rolling Stone wrote: "[Was Encore] a feint designed to double the wallop of 'Mosh,' which signaled a Marshall Mathers gone political — too late to help his candidate, but, be real, the Muse doesn't follow a schedule." The Guardian was positive: "Finally, there is Mosh, the anti-war, anti-Bush track "leaked" just before the election. It offers both the best lyric Eminem has ever written and the one moment on the album where the repetitious production style works, providing a suitably relentless basis for his quickfire hectoring. That Mosh seemingly did nothing to affect the election's outcome is something of a double-edged sword." Franklin Soults of The Boston Phoenix was a bit negative toward the song: "In the latest Rolling Stone, Eminem says he hopes his galvanizing anti-Bush single "Mosh" wasn't "too little, too late." Well, it was, and this puke-and-shit-stained album makes it even less likely that sympathizers who read Rolling Stone or the Phoenix will reach out for it anyway"; he did state, however, that the album had "several moments more consistently remarkable than 'Mosh'", including "Mockingbird" and "Like Toy Soldiers".

The New York Times noted that this song "gained notoriety for its anti-Bush lyrics, but Eminem sounds nearly as long-winded as the politicians he's excoriating." Shaking Through called this song "political screed." Slant Magazine called it "a protest song originally intended solely for online promotion but which quickly earned its status as the album's official second single. 'Mosh' is not only a worthy follow-up to 'Lose Yourself,' it had the potential to shepherd thousands of young, seemingly apathetic voters to the polls on Election Day—had it not been released after almost every registration deadline in the country."  The publisher added that the song "[matched] America's angriest pop voice with America's most righteous pastime: Bush-bashing. George W. Bush and Eminem might seem like unlikely foes—after all, the enemy of your enemy is your friend, right?—but Eminem is the poster boy for pushing the limits of the 1st Amendment, and bashing the President is currently the most vilified form of free speech in the country, so who better to champion the cause? 'Maybe this is God just sayin' we're responsible/For this monster, this coward that we have empowered,' he spits rhythmically atop a sturdy, dirge-like beat." Stylus Magazine was the most negative of all: "Add [in] Em's brand new tendency to bite himself, and you've actually got a pretty airtight case for playing the career suicide card."

Track listing
CD single

Chart positions
Though not entering the US R&B/Hip-Hop Singles, the song at least peaked in the US Bubbling Under R&B/Hip-Hop Singles at #12.

See also
 List of anti-war songs

References

External links
Read reviews or download "Mosh"
Read reviews or stream "Mosh," -- smaller file-size version from The Internet Archive
Read reviews or download the updated version of "Mosh"
 MOSH VIDEO RE-EDITED, ContactMusic.com, November 30, 2004

2004 songs
Eminem songs
Songs written by Eminem
2004 United States presidential election in popular culture
Cultural depictions of George W. Bush
Songs written by Mark Batson
Songs written by Mike Elizondo
Song recordings produced by Dr. Dre
Protest songs
Shady Records singles
Aftermath Entertainment singles
Interscope Records singles
Hardcore hip hop songs
Political rap songs
Songs about George W. Bush